The 1989 NCAA Division I Men's Golf Championships were contested at the 51st annual NCAA-sanctioned golf tournament for determining the individual and team national champions of men's collegiate golf at the Division I level in the United States.

The tournament was held at the Oak Tree Country Club in Edmond, Oklahoma, a suburb of Oklahoma City.

Oklahoma won the team championship, the Sooners' first NCAA title.

Future professional and five-time major champion Phil Mickelson, from Arizona State, won the individual title, his first of three.

Individual results

Individual champion
 Phil Mickelson, Arizona State (281)

Team results

Finalists

Eliminated after 36 holes

DC = Defending champions
Debut appearance

References

NCAA Men's Golf Championship
Golf in Oklahoma
NCAA Golf Championship
NCAA Golf Championship
NCAA Golf Championship